Piero Gleijeses (born 1944 in Venice, Italy) is a professor of United States foreign policy at the Paul H. Nitze School of Advanced International Studies (SAIS) at Johns Hopkins University. He is best known for his scholarly studies of Cuban foreign policy under Fidel Castro, which earned him a Guggenheim Fellowship in 2005, and has also published several works on US intervention in Latin America. He is the only foreign scholar to have been allowed access to the Cuba's Castro-era government archives.

Education and work 
Gleijeses gained a PhD in international relations from the Graduate Institute of International Studies in Geneva, and knows Afrikaans, French, German, Italian, Portuguese, Russian, and Spanish.

His 2002 book, Conflicting Missions: Havana, Washington and Africa, 1959–1976, was an exhaustive re-examination of the Cuban involvement in the decolonization of Africa. Hailed by Jorge Dominguez as "the best study available of Cuban operations in Africa during the Cold War", it won SHAFR's Robert H. Ferrell Book Prize for 2003. Visions of Freedom (2013) picks up from Conflicting Missions by looking at the clash between Cuba, the United States, the Soviet Union, and South Africa in southern Africa between 1976 and 1991.

Aside from scholarly journals, Gleijeses has contributed to such publications as Foreign Affairs and the London Review of Books.

Selected publications

Books

Articles and chapters

Awards and distinctions 

 2005 – Guggenheim Fellowship
 2003 – Cuban Medal of Friendship
 2003 – Robert H. Ferrell Book Prize

Personal life 
Gleijeses is married to artist Setsuko Ono, the sister of Yoko Ono.

References

External links 
 Piero Gleijeses page at Johns Hopkins SAIS
 Over 160 documents from closed Cuban archives obtained by Gleijeses and released on the CWIHP Digital Archive
 Gleijeses' introduction to CWIHP e-Dossier No. 44, which consists of the above 160+ documents

1944 births
Living people
Graduate Institute of International and Development Studies alumni
Johns Hopkins University faculty
Writers from Venice
Italian emigrants to the United States
Italian expatriates in Switzerland